The 2008 North American SuperLiga was the second edition of the SuperLiga competition. The top four Major League Soccer and Liga MX teams by point totals at the end of the season earned qualification.
All games of the tournament were broadcast live on Fox Sports World in Canada (English), Telefutura in the United States (Spanish), and Televisa and TV Azteca in Mexico (both Spanish).

Qualification
The eight teams in the 2008 edition were selected based on qualification rules set by their respective leagues.
The 2008 SuperLiga contestants were:

From  Major League Soccer
 D.C. United (2007 Supporters' Shield)
 Chivas USA (2007 season 2nd overall)
 Houston Dynamo (2007 season 3rd overall)
 New England Revolution (2007 season 4th overall)

From   La Primera División
 Guadalajara (2006 Apertura champion)
 Pachuca (2007 Clausura champion)
 Atlante (2007 Apertura champion)
 Santos Laguna (2008 Clausura champion)

Group stage
There were two groups of four teams. Each group contained two clubs from each league with the top two teams from each groups advancing to the semifinals.

Group A

Group B

Knockout stage

Bracket

Semi-finals

Final

Goalscorers
3 goals
 Stuart Holden ( Houston Dynamo)
 Shalrie Joseph ( New England Revolution)
 Ante Razov ( Chivas USA)
2 goals

 Omar Arellano ( Guadalajara)
 Bobby Boswell ( Houston Dynamo)
 Francis Doe ( D.C. United)
 Luciano Emilio ( D.C. United)
 Luis Gabriel Rey ( Atlante)
 Corey Ashe ( Houston Dynamo)

1 goal

 Damián Ariel Álvarez ( Pachuca)
 Cristian Benítez ( Santos Laguna)
 Christian Bermudez ( Atlante)
 Gabriel Caballero ( Pachuca)
 Ricardo Clark ( Houston Dynamo)
 Dwayne De Rosario ( Houston Dynamo)
 Kheli Dube ( New England Revolution)
 Gerardo Espinoza ( Atlante)
 Giancarlo Maldonado ( Atlante)
 Bruno Marioni ( Pachuca)
 Brian Mullan ( Houston Dynamo)
 Gonzalo Pineda ( Guadalajara)
 Khano Smith ( New England Revolution)
 Nate Jaqua ( Houston Dynamo)
 Steve Ralston ( New England Revolution)
 Kei Kamara ( Houston Dynamo)

References

External links
 SuperLiga 2008 Official Website

2008
North
North